The 2019 Nigerian Senate election in the FCT held on 23 February 2019, to elect the member of the Nigerian Senate to represent the Federal Capital Territory. Philips Tanimu Adada representing the FCT senatorial district won on the platform of the People's Democratic Party.

Overview

Summary

Results

FCT 
A total of 32 candidates registered with the Independent National Electoral Commission to contest in the election. PDP candidate Philips Tanimu Aduda won the election, defeating APC candidate Zaphaniah Jisalo Bitrus and 30 other party candidates. Aduda received 61.41% of the votes, while Jisalo received 34.64%.

References 

Federal Capital Territory senatorial elections
Federal Capital Territory Senate elections